Rescue 1122 is an emergency service that serves Punjab Province , KPK Province , Balochistan Province , Sindh Province,  Gilgitbaltistan and Azad Kashmir in Pakistan. The service is accessed by calling 1122 from any phone in Pakistan.

Initially it was established under the 2006 Punjab Emergency Service (Pervaiz Elahi was the Chief Minister of Punjab) Act to provide management of emergencies such as fire, rescue and emergency medical services. The Punjab Emergency Council and District Emergency Boards have been constituted to ensure management and prevention of emergencies and to recommend measures for mitigation of hazards endangering public safety. Dr Rizwan Naseer is the current Director General of Rescue 1122 Pakistan.

Background and history
In more advanced developing countries, establishing ambulance transport systems is more feasible, but still requires considerable expertise and planning. Prior to 2004, Pakistan did not have an organized emergency medical system. In that year, Rescue 1122 was launched as a professional pre-hospital emergency service, and it has managed to achieve an average response time of seven minutes, comparable to that of developed nations. Some critical factors in its success included local manufacture of vehicles, training instructors to certify emergency medical technicians, adopting training materials to the local context, and branching out to include fire and rescue service response under a united command structure.

After the success of the Lahore Pilot Project launched in 2004, Rescue 1122 was established in the Government of Chaudhary Pervaiz Elahi in Punjab. Rescue 1122 is operational in all districts of Punjab with a population of over 110 million and providing technical assistance to other Provinces of Pakistan. Rescue 1122 includes Emergency Ambulance, Rescue & Fire services and a Community Safety program.

Operations
The District Emergency Officer is responsible for the day-to-day operational management and administration of the Service in the Districts in close coordination with the District Administration. The office of the Director General is mainly responsible for the overall monitoring to ensure uniformity and quality, training, planning, research and development through the Provincial Monitoring Cell. The management is currently working to improve its services. In March 2013, Emergency Rescue Service Rawalpindi received 14 new fully equipped ambulances.

Presently, Rescue 1122 is representing a model of integrated emergency services in the world. It offers emergency, fire, rescue, disaster management, water rescue, animal rescue and community safety services under one umbrella.

Emergency Services Academy
The Emergency Services Academy, the first training institute of its kind in Pakistan, has been established as a centre for imparting emergency medical training, fire fighting, collapse structure search & rescue, high angle & confined space rescue, water rescue and other emergency management skills. The Academy has been established in vacant Government premises and the construction of a purpose-built campus is underway. It consists of a Training Manikins lab, Rescue Simulation Building, Hazmat Incident Training, Urban Search and Rescue Simulator.

Emergency management training uses a variety of incident scenarios which have been simulated for hands on training for the personnel of Emergency Services. Fires, building collapse, hazardous material incidents and emergencies involving mass casualties are created routinely whilst standards of safety are maintained at all levels. Training material developed by Punjab Emergency Service (Rescue 1122) supports the practical training.

The Academy is in the process of obtaining international accreditation. Bilateral collaboration between PES and emergency services of the United Kingdom have trained emergency officers in the UK. Moreover, Rescue 1122 is now also training Pakistan Army's Medical Corp.

References

External links
 

Ambulance services in Pakistan
Government agencies of Punjab, Pakistan
Emergency telephone numbers
2006 establishments in Pakistan